Topete is a Portuguese and Spanish surname, which derives from the Portuguese topete, meaning "quiff" and "cockscomb". The name may refer to:

Juan Bautista Topete (1821–1885), Spanish admiral and politician
Pascual Cervera y Topete (1839–1909), Spanish admiral

References

Portuguese-language surnames
Spanish-language surnames